Multnomah is a neighborhood in the southwest section of Portland, Oregon, centered on the Multnomah Village business district.  The community developed in the 1910s around a depot of the Oregon Electric Railway of the same name.  It was annexed by the city of Portland on November 7, 1950.

Multnomah is bordered by SW 45th Ave. on the west, SW Capitol Hill Road on the east, SW Vermont St. on the north, and I-5 in the south.  Exceptions are the area north of SW Nevada Ct. and east of SW 26th Ave. (part of Hillsdale), an area south of SW Multnomah Blvd. and north of SW Dolph St. where SW 48th Ave. is the western border, and an area south of SW Marigold St. where SW Capitol Highway is the western border.  The neighborhood is bordered by Maplewood, Ashcreek, and Crestwood on the west, Hayhurst and Hillsdale to the north, and South Burlingame, Markham, and West Portland Park to the south and east.

A bit of Portland history played out in the Village on April 7, 1987, when Mayor Bud Clark fired Police Chief Jim Davis while the two were having a breakfast meeting at the Fat City Cafe.

The neighborhood celebrates "Multnomah Days" with a parade and street festival on the third Saturday of August.

Historic buildings
 The Multnomah School (1913) has, since 1979, served as the Multnomah Art Center. 
 The Nelson Thomas building (1913) now houses Marco's Cafe.
 The 1925 Masonic Lodge (Orenomah Chapter No. 141) is now the Lucky Labrador Public House.

Temporary homeless shelter
In November, 2015, the City of Portland opened up the Jerome F. Sears building as a temporary homeless shelter,  which was a controversial shelter operated by an organization called Transition Projects. Then mayor Charlie Hales promised the shelter was going to close on May 31, 2016. In June 2016, the city asked to remain open for three additional months, however  the neighbors demanded the shelter closed. Neighbors have expressed that city is trying a "bait and switch" and also commented that the former Army Reserve building was deeded to the city for use as emergency management use only.

Parks 
 Gabriel Park (1950)
 Custer Park (1954), named for Gen. George Armstrong Custer

References

External links

 Multnomah Historical Association
 The Southwest Portland Post newspaper

 
Neighborhoods in Portland, Oregon
Streetcar suburbs